The 2019 Netball World Cup (also known as the 2019 Vitality Netball World Cup for sponsorship reasons) was the 15th edition of the INF Netball World Cup. It was held from 12–21 July 2019 at the Liverpool Arena in Liverpool, England with matches being held on two courts. Host nation England finished their campaign with a bronze medal. New Zealand became 5th time champions after beating Australia in the final and gold medal match.

Sixteen nations contested for the title, which included the top six of the previous tournament which was held in Sydney, Australia. After two group stage rounds, Australia, England, New Zealand and South Africa all made it to the semi-finals. In a rematch of the 2015 final, New Zealand would take home their fifth title after defeating Australia by one goal. England finished in third place, after defeating South Africa.

Trinidad and Tobago's Rhonda John-Davis appeared in her sixth World Cup, a World Cup record.

Organisation

The 2019 Netball World Cup was launched in January 2018 at St George's Hall in Liverpool, the host city. Liverpool was selected as the host city for the event in February 2015 by the International Netball Federation.

Venue
All matches at the event were held at the Liverpool Arena (known for sponsorship reasons as M&S Bank Arena), which has a seating capacity of 11,000. The venue is the centrepiece of the ACC Liverpool sporting and events precinct, allowing the event's other amenities, such as warm-up and administration facilities, to take place within the one location.

Broadcasters
This is a list of the broadcasters for the tournament in competing countries and regions.

Umpires
Seventeen umpires from seven countries officiated matches at the tournament.

Teams

Qualification
Sixteen teams contested the 2019 title. Five teams automatically qualified by virtue of their high ranking position in the INF World Rankings, and England qualified as the host nation. The remaining ten teams qualified via regional qualification tournaments, with two teams selected from each of the five international netball regions; Africa, Americas, Asia, Europe and Oceania. The five teams (six if England is included) to be granted automatic qualification, in order of seeding were:
  
  (host nation)
  
  
  
 

Qualification tournaments

Squads

Format
A new format was introduced for the edition. Teams competed in three stages; the Preliminaries Stage One (12–14 July), Preliminaries Stage Two (15–18 July) and the Play-offs and Placings matches (19–21 July).

Preliminaries Stage One
There were four groups (A, B, C and D) of four teams in the first stage, with the top eight teams pre-assigned to their groups and one team from the 9th–12th seeds and one from the 13th–16th seeds drawn randomly into each group. However no more than two teams from the one region can be drawn into the same group. The top three teams from each group progressed to the second preliminaries stage.

Preliminaries Stage Two
The top three teams from Groups A and B formed Group F, and the top three teams from Groups C and D formed Group G. The bottom four finishers from Groups A-D competed against one another in Group E. Where teams in Groups F and G have already played each other in the Preliminaries Stage One (i.e. A1 has already played A2 and A3), these results will carry through to the Preliminaries Stage Two.

Play-offs and Placings
The teams finishing first and second in Groups F and G went through to the semi-finals, with the top placed team in each group facing the second placed team in the other group. The winners of each semi-final competed for gold in the final, with the losers playing for bronze.

The teams finishing third and fourth in Groups F and G competed for final positions fifth to eighth – third in one group plays fourth in the other – with the winners playing off for fifth place and the losers for seventh. The teams that finished fifth in Groups F and G played off for ninth and 10th places. The teams that finished last in Groups F and G played off for 11th and 12th places. The teams that finished first and second in Group E played off for 13th and 14th place and the teams that finish third and fourth in Group E played off for the 15th and 16th places.

Preliminaries Stage One

Group A

Group B

Group C

Group D

(H) Host.

Preliminaries Stage Two

Group E
Group E contains the four bottom teams from Groups A-D and compete for final placings 13th to 16th.

Group F
The top three teams from Groups A and B advance to Group F. All six teams previously played two matches against Group F teams – for example, each team in Group A played the two other Group A teams who advanced to Group F. At the start of Group F the table is initialised to include the results of these two Group A or Group B matches for each team. The former Group A teams play the former Group B teams in three rounds of three matches in Group F.

Teams finishing first and second in Group F go through to the semi-finals – the top team in Group F plays the second team in Group G and the second team in Group F plays the top team in Group G. The four remaining teams in Group F compete for the final placings from 5th to 12th.

(Q) Qualified to semi-finals.

Group G
The top three teams from Groups C and D advance to Group G. All six teams previously played two matches against Group G teams – for example, each team in Group C played the two other Group C teams who advanced to Group G. At the start of Group G the table is initialised to include the results of these two Group C or Group D matches for each team. The former Group C teams play the former Group D teams in three rounds of three matches in Group G.

Teams finishing first and second in Group G go through to the semi-finals – the top team in Group G plays the second team in Group F and the second team in Group G plays the top team in Group F. The four remaining teams in Group G compete for the final placings from 5th to 12th.

(Q) Qualified to semi-finals. (H) Host.

Placement matches

15th place

13th place

11th place

9th place

5th–8th

5th–8th play-offs

7th place

5th place

Semi-finals and medal matches
At the conclusion of qualifying pool play Australia, England, South Africa and New Zealand advanced into the semi-finals. It was the first time South Africa had made it to the semi-finals since 1995 when it played in the final after winning its second round group, while Jamaica missed out for the first time since 1999. During pool play Australia had edged New Zealand by one goal to top Group F and England easily beat South Africa to take out Group G. That meant Australia would face South Africa in one semi-final, with England squaring off against New Zealand in the other.

England were favourites in their semi final, being the commonwealth games champions and having gone undefeated for two years against New Zealand. However, New Zealand started stronger, scoring the opening five goals. England came back to take a 24–21 lead at half time. Heading into the final quarter New Zealand were ahead by three goals and managed to hold on for a 47–45 victory.

Australia started with a second string side against South Africa in the other semi, resting their captain and leaving some of their stars on the bench. At half time they led 31–23. South Africa fought back to out score Australia in the third quarter and close the gap to just four goals. They continued to push Australia through the last quarter and in the end it required some great defense to close out the game. Australia ended victors with a 55–53 scoreline. 
The final between Australia and New Zealand was a tense and thrilling match. The opening quarter went back and forth finishing with both teams tied on 10 goals. The second quarter continued in this vein with both teams going tit for tat scoring goals. In the final minute of the quarter New Zealand got on a roll scoring three consecutive times to take a 25–28 lead into the half. They carried this momentum early into the third quarter to extend the lead to seven goals, before Australia fought back to close it to a four-goal advantage by the quarters end. The score leading into the final quarter was 37–41 to New Zealand. Australia pushed hard in the final quarter of the match, but were unable to take the lead. They got within one goal in the final minute, but New Zealand were then able to hold on to possession to close out the match. The final score was 51–52.

Semi-finals

Bronze medal match

Gold and silver medals match

Tournament top scorers

 Updated – 22 July 2019

Final placings

Medallists

References

External links

 Official website
 PDF Fixture Overview

 
2019
2019 in netball
2019 in English netball
International netball competitions hosted by England
Netball
Netball
Netball